Bogo is a small settlement in the Municipality of Sežana in the Littoral region of Slovenia. Part of the village was burned down by German soldiers in the Second World War.

The local church is dedicated to Saint Catherine of Alexandria and belongs to the Parish of Štjak.

References

External links
Bogo on Geopedia

Populated places in the Municipality of Sežana